Vila Matautia is a Samoan former professional rugby league footballer who played in the 1990s and 2000s. He was a Samoan international and played at the 1995 Rugby League World Cup. He also played with St Helens in the Super League, having championship and Challenge Cup Final success with them.

Background
Matautia was born in Samoa.

Club career
Matautia started his career at Doncaster in 1990.

Matautia played for St Helens from the interchange bench in their 1996 Challenge Cup Final victory over Bradford Bulls.
Matautia played for St. Helens from the interchange bench in their 1999 Super League Grand Final victory over Bradford Bulls.

Matautia played as an interchange/substitute (replacing  Ian Pickavance on 25-minutes) in St. Helens' 16-25 defeat by Wigan in the 1995–96 Regal Trophy Final during the 1995–96 at Alfred McAlpine Stadium, Huddersfield on Saturday 13 January 1996. As Super League V champions, St. Helens played against 2000 NRL Premiers, the Brisbane Broncos in the 2001 World Club Challenge. Matautia played from the interchange bench in Saints' victory.

Matautia left Saints and joined Leigh Centurions in 2002.

Representative career
Matautia represented Samoa, and played at the 1995 Rugby League World Cup. He also played for the United States rugby league team, trying to get them into the 2000 Rugby League World Cup through his grandmother who was born in Hawaii.

Assault conviction
In December 2017, he assaulted a 15-year-old Rainford High Technology College pupil, inflicting a broken nose, fractured cheek bone and severe bruising. In July 2018, he pleaded guilty and received a seven-month sentence, suspended for 18 months.

References

External links
Saints Heritage Society profile
World Cup 1995 details

1969 births
Living people
Doncaster R.L.F.C. players
Expatriate rugby league players in England
Leigh Leopards players
Rugby league props
Samoa national rugby league team players
Samoan sportspeople
Samoan expatriate rugby league players
Samoan expatriate sportspeople in England
Samoan rugby league players
St Helens R.F.C. players
United States national rugby league team players